Eric Allan (born 8 March 1940) is a British actor.

His first film role was in Peter Brook's 1968 film Tell Me Lies, based on the play US in which Allan had appeared the previous year.

For 24 years from 1997 to 2021 he played the part of farm worker Bert Fry in the long running BBC Radio soap opera The Archers

Selected filmography
 Tell Me Lies (1968)
 The McKenzie Break (1970)
 Bleak Moments (1971)
 I.D. (1995)

Selected television
 Emmerdale (1972–1974) as Frank Blakey (regular role)
Nuts in May (1976) as The Quarrayman (Play for Today Episode)
 Hold the Back Page (1985–1986) as Reg
 Bergerac  as Peter Retford 1988 in Private Flight

Selected theatre
 US (1966)

References

External links
 

1940 births
British male film actors
British male television actors
20th-century British male actors
Living people
Place of birth missing (living people)